The canton of Château-Arnoux-Saint-Auban is an administrative division of the Alpes-de-Haute-Provence department in southeastern France. It was created in the French canton reorganisation which came into effect in March 2015. Its seat is  Château-Arnoux-Saint-Auban.

It consists of the following communes: 
 
Aubignosc
Château-Arnoux-Saint-Auban
Châteauneuf-Val-Saint-Donat
L'Escale
Ganagobie
Montfort
Peyruis
Volonne

References

Cantons of Alpes-de-Haute-Provence